A borough (also spelled boro), in the context of local government in the U.S. state of New Jersey, refers to one of five types and one of eleven forms of municipal government (in addition to those established under a Special Charter).

Though it is now the most common form of local government in New Jersey, by 1875 only 17 boroughs had been created, all by special acts of the legislature. These original boroughs were subdivisions of townships, established by state charter; Elizabeth was the first, established by royal charter in 1740, within the now defunct Elizabeth Township. About half of them had been dissolved, or changed into other forms of government—often cities. In 1875, a constitutional amendment prohibited such local or special legislation.

Legislation
As enacted, a borough would be governed by an elected mayor (serving a one-year term) and a six-member council (elected to staggered three-year terms). The mayor would preside at council meetings, but had no vote except to break ties. This system resulted in a period, known as "boroughitis", where large numbers of small boroughs were created. In 1894, the Legislature passed an act requiring each township to have a single school district. A wave of borough incorporations followed, as one part of several townships decided that it would prefer the cost of being a separate municipality to paying for the other schools.

The Borough Act of 1897 amended the original Act, eliminating the self-executing incorporation feature of the earlier legislation. Henceforth, newly incorporated boroughs (or those seeking to dissolve or increase or decrease in size) required approval of the legislature. The elected mayor and six-member council were retained, with the mayor now serving a two-year term.

The Borough Act of 1987 was created to streamline borough law and clear away amendments, changes and contradictory rules that had accumulated over the century of the Borough's existence as a form of government. The 1987 Act allowed for the delegation of executive responsibility to an appointed administrator.

Traditionally, voters elect a mayor and six council-members at-large in a partisan election. Only two boroughs, Roselle and Roselle Park, have ward structures with councils having five ward members and one at-large. The borough system has a weak mayor and the council performs most legislative and executive functions. This form of local government is used by 39% of the municipalities in New Jersey.

See also 

 List of municipalities in New Jersey

References 

Local government in New Jersey